Strandlund is a surname. Notable people with the surname include:

Carl Strandlund (1899–1974), Swedish-born American inventor and entrepreneur
Jan Strandlund (born 1962), Swedish curler and curling coach
Maria Strandlund (born 1969), Swedish tennis player 

Swedish-language surnames